Faucherea is a group of trees in the family Sapotaceae described as a genus in 1920.

The entire genus is endemic to Madagascar.

Species

References

Sapotoideae
Sapotaceae genera
Endemic flora of Madagascar